A near-close vowel or a near-high vowel is any in a class of vowel sound used in some spoken languages. The defining characteristic of a near-close vowel is that the tongue is positioned similarly to a close vowel, but slightly less constricted.

Other names for a near-close vowel are lowered close vowel and raised close-mid vowel, though the former phrase may also be used to describe a vowel that is as low as close-mid (sometimes even lower); likewise, the latter phrase may also be used to describe a vowel that is as high as close.

Near-close vowels are also sometimes described as lax variants of the fully close vowels, though, depending on the language, they may not necessarily be variants of close vowels at all.

It is rare for languages to contrast a near-close vowel with a close vowel and a close-mid vowel based on height alone. This contrast is not present in Conservative Danish, which realizes the latter two vowels as, respectively, close-mid  and mid .

It is even rarer for languages to contrast more than one close/near-close/close-mid triplet. For instance, Sotho has two such triplets: fully front  and fully back . In the case of this language, the near-close vowels  tend to be transcribed with the phonetically inaccurate symbols , i.e. as if they were close central.

It may be somewhat more common for languages to contain allophonic vowel triplets that are not contrastive; for instance, Russian has one such triplet:
 close-mid central rounded , an allophone of  after soft consonants.

Partial list
The near-close vowels that have dedicated symbols in the International Phonetic Alphabet are:

 near-close near-front unrounded vowel 
 near-close near-front compressed vowel 
 near-close near-back rounded vowel 

There also are near-close vowels that don't have dedicated symbols in the IPA:

 near-close near-front protruded vowel 
 near-close central unrounded vowel 
 near-close central compressed vowel 
 near-close central protruded vowel 
 near-close near-back unrounded vowel  or 
 near-close near-back compressed vowel 

(IPA letters for rounded vowels are ambiguous as to whether the rounding is protrusion or compression. However, transcription of the world's languages tends to pattern as above.)

References

Bibliography

 
 
 
 
 
 

Vowels by height